Quarry Town (sometimes spelled Quarrytown) is an unincorporated community in Ste. Genevieve County, in the U.S. state of Missouri.

History
A post office called Quarrytown was established in 1871, and remained in operation until 1873. The community was named for a quarry near the original town site.

References

Unincorporated communities in Ste. Genevieve County, Missouri
Unincorporated communities in Missouri